Landfall is a 1975 New Zealand film directed by Paul Maunder.
The film was first shown at the 1977 Wellington Film Festival.

This film was made for television, but not broadcast because of its content, and was then formatted for cinema release.

Synopsis
Members of a rural commune are discovered using illegal drugs by a local policeman. They kill the policeman and bury him in their garden. The commune then starts to disintegrate.

Cast
 Denise Maunder as Sandra
 John Anderson as John
 Sam Neill as Eric
 Gael Anderson as Elizabeth
 Rowena Zinsli as Girl
 Russell Duncan as Tramp
 Michael Haigh as Policeman
 Pat Evison as Visitor
 Jonathan Dennis as Reporter
 Owen Taylor as Addict

Reviews
 1976 The Press - first prize in the Asian Broadcasting Union festival.

References

External links 
 

1975 films
1970s New Zealand films
1970s English-language films
Films shot in New Zealand
National Film Unit
New Zealand drama films
New Zealand television films